The 2005 Scott Tournament of Hearts, the Canadian women's curling championship, was held at Mile One Stadium in St. John's, Newfoundland and Labrador from February 19 to 27, 2005. The tournament included 12 teams, one from each of Canada's provinces, one from Canada's territories and the defending champion Colleen Jones, whose team was known as Team Canada. Oddly, Jones' team is the only returning team from the 2004 Scott Tournament of Hearts as all other provincial champions lost in their playdowns. Colleen Jones, who had won the last four tournaments (for a total of 6) is joined by Cathy King who won the tournament in 1998.  Also participating is 2002 Manitoba champion Jennifer Jones, 2001 Yukon/Northwest Territories champion Kerry Koe, 4-time Newfoundland champion Heather Strong, 2000 Nova Scotia champion (and former third of Colleen Jones) Kay Zinck, 3-time Prince Edward Island champion skip Rebecca Jean MacPhee, 1996 Quebec champion second Brenda Nicholls (playing skip this time), 1993 New Brunswick champion second Sandy Comeau (playing skip this time) as well as newcomers Kelly Scott of British Columbia, Jenn Hanna of Ontario and Stefanie Lawton of Saskatchewan.

After the round-robin play, 4 teams were tied for the last playoff spot, and defending champion of the last 4 years, Colleen Jones was eliminated in her first tie-breaker match against New Brunswick's Sandy Comeau who would later lose to Jenn Hanna of Ontario. As Colleen Jones was eliminated, it had become clear there was a new era in Canadian women's curling, and that was of youth. Three of the four playoff teams were former national junior champions (Lawton in 2001, Jennifer Jones in 1994 and Scott in 1995), and the other was a runner-up (Hanna in 1998). In the end, it was Jennifer Jones over Hanna, in a very close game that came down to the final shot.

Television coverage
Controversy arose during the 2005 Scott Tournament of Hearts, as it was the first major tournament where the Canadian Broadcasting Corporation had full rights to televise the games. Previously, The Sports Network showed all the draws except the semi-final and the final, which was covered by the CBC. However, in a decision made in 2004, the Canadian Curling Association awarded the new contract to CBC, which had a higher bid than TSN. This would mean only the afternoon draws would be covered on the main network while evening draws were shown on the Digital Cable Channel, CBC Country Canada which only reached half a million Canadian homes. Morning draws, which TSN did not want to renew anyway were not shown at all. Many Canadian fans were outraged come Tournament time, as they were disappointed with what many considered inferior coverage on the CBC as well as the scheduling problems. Some games were moved to The Score and some games on CBC Country Canada were cut short because of Canadian Radio-television and Telecommunications Commission (CRTC) regulations that restricted the channel to only 12.4 hours of sports per week. This angered fans, and the CCA as well as many event sponsors were sent many angry letters and phone calls, some people even threatening to boycott the sponsors.

Teams

Round robin standings

Results
All times local (Eastern Time Zone, ET)

Draw 1
February 19, 2:00 PM ET

Draw 2
February 19, 7:30 PM ET

Draw 3
February 20, 9:30 AM ET

Draw 4
February 20, 2:00 PM ET

Draw 5
February 20, 7:30 PM ET

Draw 6
February 21, 9:30 AM ET

Draw 7
February 21, 2:00 PM ET

Draw 8
February 21, 2:00 PM ET

Draw 9
February 22, 9:30 AM ET

Draw 10
February 22, 2:00 PM ET

Draw 11
February 22, 7:30 PM ET

Draw 12
February 23, 9:30 AM  ET

Draw 13
February 23, 2:00 PM ET

Draw 14
February 23, 7:30 ET

Draw 15
February 24, 9:30 AM ET

Draw 16
February 24, 2:00 PM ET

Draw 17
February 24, 7:30 PM ET

Tiebreaker 1 
February 25, 8:00 AM ET

Tiebreaker 2 
February 25, 12:30 PM ET

Playoffs

1 vs. 2
February 25, 6:00 PM ET

3 vs. 4
February 25, 6:00 PM ET

Semi-finalFebruary 26, 2:00 PM ETFinalFebruary 27, 12:30 PM ETThe final game between Jenn Hanna of Ontario and Jennifer Jones of Manitoba came down to the very last shot. Ontario had control of the game, and looked like they were going to pull if off at the end. However, in the last end they did not have the hammer, meaning Jones would have last rock. Ontario had a rock on the button that was well guarded, and the only way at it was an in-off a rock sitting just outside the house. Jones made this very difficult shot, which gave her four points and the win.

Awards
Tournament Most Valuable Player: Jenn Hanna, Ontario

First All-Star team
Lead: Nancy Delahunt, Team Canada
Second: Dawn Askin, Ontario
Third: Marliese Miller, Saskatchewan
Skip: Jennifer Jones, Manitoba

Second All-Star team
Lead: Susan O'Leary, Newfoundland and Labrador
Second: Sherri Singler, Saskatchewan
Third: Pascale Letendre, Ontario
Skip: Jenn Hanna, Ontario

Top player PercentagesRound-robin 
Leads 
Nancy Delahunt, Canada 91%
Susan O'Leary, Nfld. & Lab. 91%
Chelsey Bell, Saskatchewan 88%
Steph Hanna, Ontario 88%
Tracy Bush, Alberta 85%

Seconds
Dawn Askin, Ontario 84%
Sherri Singler, Saskatchewan 83%
Mary-Anne Arsenault, Canada 83%
Sasha Carter, B.C. 81%
Robyn MacPhee, P.E.I. 80%

Thirds
Marliese Miller, Saskatchewan 82%
Pascale Letendre, Ontario 82%
Lori Armitstead, Alberta 82%
Allison Ross, Quebec 81%

Skips
Jennifer Jones, Manitoba 81%
Stefanie Lawton, Saskatchewan 81%
Jenn Hanna, Ontario 80%
Cathy King, Alberta 80%
Kelly Scott, B.C. 79%

Provincial playdowns
Defending provincial champions are indicated in bold.

Alberta
@ the Lethbridge Curling Club in Lethbridge. Cathy King defeated Shannon Kleibrink in the finals 5–4 on January 30.Results:
Cathy King, Saville Centre CC, Edmonton (5–2) won semi-final, won final
Shannon Kleibrink, Calgary Winter Club (6–1) lost final
Renelle Bryden, Calgary CC (5–2) lost semi-final
Deb Santos, Saville Centre CC, Edmonton (4–3)
Renée Sonnenberg, Grande Prairie CC (4–3)
Diane Foster, Garrison CC and Calgary CC (2–5)
Cindy Serna, Saville Centre CC, Edmonton (2–5)
Jodi Busche, Fort St. John and Grande Prairie CC (0–7)

British Columbia
@ the Marpole Curling Club in Vancouver. Kelly Scott's team wins final on January 22 over Patti Knezevic 7–6.
Kelly Scott, Kelowna CC (6–1) won final
Patti Knezevic, Prince George Golf & CC (5–2) won semi, lost final
Pat Sanders, Duncan CC (4–3) - won tie-breaker, lost semi
Jerri-Pat Armstrong, Cranbrook CC (4–3) - lost tie-breaker
Toni Wills, Gordon Ears Winter Club, Maple Ridge (3–4)
Janelle Yardley, Kamloops CC (3–4)
Georgina Wheatcroft, Valley CC, Cloverdale (2–5)
Kristy Lewis, Richmond CC (1–6)

Manitoba
@ the Souris Glenwood Arena in Souris. Jennifer Jones defeated Kristy Jenion 5–4 in the finals on January 30.Results:
Red Group
Lois Fowler, Wheat City CC, Brandon (6–1) lost "red1-black1" game, lost semi-final
Liza Park, Brandon CC (5–2) lost "red2-black2" game
Joelle Duguid, Fort Rouge CC, Winnipeg (4–3)
Karen Young, Springfield CC, Dugald (4–3)
Janet Harvey, Fort Rouge CC, Winnipeg (4–3)
Chris Scalena, Starbuck CC (3–4)
Gwen Wooley, Morden CC (2–5)
Lois Mosiondz, The Pas CC (1–6)
Black Group
Jennifer Jones, St. Vital CC, Winnipeg (6–1) won tie-breaker, won "red2-black2" game, won semi-final, won final
Kristy Jenion, St. Vital CC, Winnipeg (6–1) won "red1-black1" game, lost final
Kristen Williamson, Brandon CC (6–1) lost tie-breaker
Barb Spencer, Fort Rouge CC, Winnipeg (3–4)
Terry Ursel, Plumas CC (3–4)
Ainsley Champagne, Fort Rouge CC, Winnipeg (2–5)
Linda Stewart, Swan River CC (2–5)
Jackie McCormick, Arborg CC (0–7)

New Brunswick
@ the Thistle St. Andrew's Curling Club in Saint John. Sandy Comeau's team wins the final on January 23 over Heidi Hanlon 6–3
Sandy Comeau, Beaver CC, Moncton (5–2) - wins tie-breaker, wins semi, wins final
Heidi Hanlon, Thistle St. Andrew's CC, Saint John (6–1) - loses final
Melissa Adams, Grand Falls CC/Curling Beauséjour Inc., Moncton (5–2) - lost semi
Sylvie Robichaud, Curling Beauséjour Inc., Moncton (5–2) - lost tie-breaker
Susan Dobson, Thistle St. Andrew's CC, Saint John (4–3)
Kathy Floyd, Thistle St. Andrew's CC, Saint John (2–5)
Karen McDermott, Beaver CC, Moncton (1–6)
Maureen McMaster, Beaver CC, Moncton (0–7)

Newfoundland and Labrador
@ the Carol Curling Club in Labrador City. Heather Strong's team wins final on January 23 over Laura Phillips 6–5
Heather Strong, St. John's CC (4–0) won final
Laura Phillips, St. John's CC (3–1) won semi, lost final
Cathy Cunningham, St. John's CC (2–2) lost semi
Debbie Porter, Carol CC, Labrador City (1–3)
Marcie Brown, St. John's CC (0–4)

Nova Scotia
@ the Yarmouth Curling Club in Yarmouth. Kay Zinck defeated Virginia Jackson 7–3 in the finals on January 30.  Teams:
Kay Zinck, Mayflower CC, Halifax (7–0) won final
Virginia Jackson, Truro CC (5–2) won semi-final, lost final
Heather Smith-Dacey, Mayflower CC, Halifax (5–2) lost semi-final
Jillian Mouzar, Mayflower CC, Halifax (4–3)
Lisa DePaoli, Glooscap CC, Kentville (3–4)
Sue-Ann Bartlett, Mayflower CC, Halifax (2–5)
Teri Lake, Mayflower CC, Halifax (1–6)
Denise Pelrine, Mayflower CC, Halifax (1–6)

Ontario

@ the Rideau Curling Club in Ottawa. After going down 1–4 early on in round-robin play, Jenn Hanna's team from the Ottawa Curling Club wins eight straight to win the championships over Krista Scharf 6–4 on January 30.  
Results:
Jenn Hanna, Ottawa CC, Ottawa 5–4; won second tie-breaker, won "3–4" game, won semi-final, won final
Krista Scharf, Fort William CC, Thunder Bay 6–3; won "1–2" game, lost final
Chrissy Cadorin, Guelph CC 7–2; lost "1–2" game, lost semi-final
Jo-Ann Rizzo, Brant CC, Brantford 6–3; lost "3–4" game
Janet McGhee, Uxbridge & District CC 5–4; won first tie-breaker, lost second
Kathy Brown, Sutton CC 5–4; lost first tie-breaker
Tara George, Fort William CC, Thunder Bay 4–5
Kim Moore, North Halton Golf & Country Club, Georgetown 3–6
Elaine Uhryn, Soo Curlers' Association, Sault Ste. Marie 3–6
Dawn Schwar, Sudbury CC 1–8Sherry Middaugh, the defending champion did not qualify.Prince Edward Island
@ the Crapaud Community Curling Club in Crapaud. Rebecca Jean MacPhee clinched the tournament with a 7–5 win over Suzanne Gaudet on January 26.Results: (teams knocked out after 3 losses)

Rebecca Jean MacPhee, Charlottetown CC (6–0)
Suzanne Gaudet, Charlottetown CC (4–3)
Shirley Berry, Cornwall CC (4–3)
Kathy O'Rourke, Charlottetown CC (3–3)
Leslie MacDougall, Charlottetown CC (3–3)
Tammy Dewar, Montague CC (3–3)
Donna Butler, Cornwall CC (2–3)
Nola Murphy, Silver Fox Curling & Yacht Club, Summerside (2–3)
Bev Beaton, Charlottetown CC (1–3)
Melissa Andrews, Crapaud Community CC (1–3)
Karen Currie, Cornwall CC (0–3)

Quebec
@ Le Club de Curling Laval-sur-le-Lac in Laval. Brenda Nicholls defeated Marie-France Larouche 10–9 in the finals on January 30.  Results: 
A
Marie-France Larouche, CC Etchemin, Saint-Romuald & CC Victoria, Sainte-Foy (5–1) wins "A1-B1" game, loses final
Ève Bélisle, CC Lachine/CC Longue-Pointe, Montreal (5–1) loses "A2-B2" game
Nathalie Gagnon, CC Riverbend, Alma / CC Kénogami Jonquière (4–2)
Claire Léveillé, CC Rouyn-Noranda (3–3)
Bonnie Dunn, CC Otterburn Legion/CC Glenmore, Dollard-des-Ormeaux (2–4)
Ruth Lavoie, CC Kénogami, Jonquière/CC Chicoutimi (1–5)
Cindy Kyle, CC Glenmore, Dollard-des-Ormeaux (1–5)
B
Brenda Nicholls, CC Victoria, Sainte-Foy (5–1) loses "A1-B1" game, wins semi-final, wins final
Chantal Osborne, CC Thurso (5–1) wins "A2-B2" game, loses semi-final
Élise Lafontaine, CC Laurier, Victoriaville (4–2)
Cheryl Morgan, CC Longue-Pointe, Montreal/CC Lachine (3–3)
Louise Desrosiers, CC Victoria, Sainte-Foy (2–4)
Élaine Roy, CC Kénogami, Jonquière/Port-Alfred, La Baie/CC Chicoutimi (1–5)
Chatnal Gadoua, CC Lacolle (1–5)

Saskatchewan
@ the Assiniboia Curling Club in Assiniboia. Stefanie Lawton defeated Sherry Anderson 9–2 in the final on February 6.Results:
Stefanie Lawton, CN CC, Saskatoon (5–2) (won semi-final, won final)
Sherry Anderson, Delisle CC (6–1) (lost final)
Chantelle Eberle, Bushell Park CC, Moose Jaw (5–2) (lost semi-final)
Cindy Street, Tartan CC, Regina (3–4)
Jan Betker, Callie CC, Regina (3–4)
Sue Altman, Foam Lake CC (3–4)
Michelle Englot, Davidson CC (2–5)
Heather Torrie, Nutana CC, Saskatoon (1–6)

Yukon/Northwest Territories
@ the Whitehorse Curling Club in Whitehorse, Yukon. Double-round robin, no final. Kerry Koe wins in a tie-breaker on January 23 over Nicole Baldwin 9–5.
Kerry Koe, Northwest Territories (4–2) wins tiebreaker 9–5
Nicole Baldwin, Yukon (4–2) loses tiebreaker 9–5
Maureen Miller, Northwest Territories (3–3)
Sandra Mikkelsen, Yukon (1–5)defending champion Stacey Stable did not qualify''

Notes

References

External links
 2005 tournament site
 Final on YouTube

2005
Scott Tournament of Hearts
Sport in St. John's, Newfoundland and Labrador
Curling in Newfoundland and Labrador
Scott Tournament of Hearts
Scott Tournament of Hearts
Scott Tournament of Hearts